William Jeffrey Michael Hodgson Jr. (June 21, 1944 – January 25, 2022) was a Canadian curler. He was the second on the 1975 Brier Champion team (skipped by Bill Tetley), representing Northern Ontario. The team later went on to finish third at the World Championships of that year. Originally from Thunder Bay, he was transferred to Winnipeg in 1979. He would later play lead for Manitoba at the 2005 and 2006 Canadian Senior Curling Championships, finishing 6th and 5th, respectively.

Personal life
Hodgson was the son of Bebe and Bill Sr. He graduated from Lakehead University in 1965 and was a member of the university hockey team. He was Vice President, Commercial Services, Cambrian Credit Union. He also worked for TD Bank, retiring from the South Winnipeg Commercial Banking Centre in 2000. He was married to Judy Glover and had three children.

References

External links
 
 William Jr. Hodgson – Curling Canada Stats Archive

Brier champions
1944 births
2022 deaths
Curlers from Thunder Bay
Curlers from Winnipeg
Canadian male curlers
Lakehead University alumni
Canadian ice hockey players